Sali Turan (born 1949, Trabzon) is a Turkish painter. He lives in Istanbul, Turkey.

Biography

He studied painting at Atatürk Educational Institute, Istanbul 1970–74.
He studied for his master's degree in painting at Istanbul State Academy of Fine Art 1976–81.
From 1978 to 1986 he was a lecturer at Marmara University in Istanbul, Uludağ University in Bursa and Anadolu University in Eskişehir.
He received his Doctorate in 1984.
He became an Associate Professor in 1985 and in 1986 he resigned from the University and devoted himself to painting.

1994 Daniel Ferguson (a friend of Francis Bacon and author of his biography) suggested opening an exhibition in a gallery of his choice in London (100 paintings)
1996–2001 Study and working tour of Europe and the United States

Awards
1974 March prize at the Istanbul IAEE Exhibition.
1974 Inter-Studio prize at the Istanbul IAEE Exhibition
1978 Kartal Festival Achievement Award
1981 Ranked first in the Teaching Examination for Institutions of Higher Education
1988 Tekel Competition prize

Selected exhibitions
2007  Gallery Akademist, Izmir
2006  Contemporary Istanbul, Kanat Bayazıt Art Gallery
2006  AKM Art Gallery, Istanbul
2005  Modern Art Gallery, Istanbul
2004  Hobi Art Gallery, Istanbul
2003  Antik Gallery, Istanbul
2001  National Arts Club Grand Gallery, New York
2001  Washington National Building Museum
2000  Atatürk Cultural Center Art Gallery, Istanbul
1998  Atelye Ulus, Istanbul
1994  Tüyap, Istanbul
1993  Kile Art Gallery, Istanbul
1990  Kile Art Gallery, Istanbul
1987  Sanat Yapım Gallery, Ankara
1986  Turban Hotel, Çeşme
1986  Kale Art Gallery, Bodrum
1982  Akbank Art Gallery, Bursa
1974  IAEE Exhibition, Istanbul

References

External links

 Official website 

1949 births
Turkish painters
Living people